"Circle Sky" is a song written by Michael Nesmith which appeared on The Monkees' sixth album, the Head soundtrack, and also in the film Head as a live concert performance.

Background and inspiration

The song is written and performed in style reminiscent to the work of musician Bo Diddley, staying mostly on a single chord (A Major), while strumming barre chords (from B Major to E Major) down the guitar neck for the intro, outro, and breaks, and from B minor to D minor for the bridge. 
The lyrics are impressions of sights and sounds on a Monkees tour, while "Hamilton's smiling down" refers to a Hamilton music stand, used for rehearsals and recording.

Release
While the movie included the song performed live by the Monkees in Salt Lake City, Utah on May 17, 1968 during a free show at the Valley Auditorium, the original soundtrack album instead substituted a studio recording, made by Nesmith and session musicians (an unexplained decision that became a major source of tension in the group). The film version intercut Vietnam War footage with concert footage and featured several mirrored shots of the band onstage.

A lo-fi transcription of the concert version was included on Monkeemania (40 Timeless Hits), a compilation from the early 1980s, and an alternate studio take appeared on  Monkee Flips in 1984. A stereo recording of the concert version appeared on Missing Links Volume Two in 1990.

A reworked version of the song opened the Monkees's 1996 reunion album Justus, featuring a rare performance by Davy Jones on guitar.

Personnel

Studio version:
Michael Nesmith - lead vocal, guitar, organ, percussion
Keith Allison - guitar
Bill Chadwick - guitar
Eddie Hoh - drums, percussion

Live version (May 17, 1968):
Michael Nesmith - lead vocal, guitar
Davy Jones - percussion, organ
Peter Tork - bass
Micky Dolenz - drums, percussion

Justus version:
Michael Nesmith - lead vocal, guitar
Davy Jones - guitar
Peter Tork - bass
Micky Dolenz - drums

References

The Monkees songs
1968 songs
Songs written by Michael Nesmith